dbx or DBX may refer to:

 dbx (debugger), a Unix source-level debugger
 dbx (company), a professional audio recording equipment company
 dbx (noise reduction), a noise reduction system invented by dbx, Inc.
 .dbx, the file extension for Microsoft Outlook Express data files
 direct byte execution, a tagline used for Jazelle, one of the execution states found in ARM processors
 DBX, annual Dropbox developer conference and NYSE ticker symbol for Dropbox
 Aston Martin DBX, an automobile model

In music:
 DBX, the stage name of turntablist Danny Marquez, formerly of Trik Turner
 DBX, an alias of American minimal techno artist Daniel Bell
 DBX, the Dave Brockie Experience
 DBX, an English group composed of producers Pete Kirtley and Sacha Collisson, and singer-songwriter John James Newman